The Amityville Horror is a 1977 book by Jay Anson.

The Amityville Horror may also refer to:
The Amityville Horror (1979 film)
The Amityville Horror (2005 film), a remake of the 1979 film

See also
List of films based on the Amityville haunting
List of Amityville Horror media